Hridayendra Shah (born 30 July 2002) is a member of the Nepalese Royal Family (now deposed) and was the second in line to Nepal's royal throne. The monarchy was officially abolished on 28 May 2008. Until the abolition of the monarchy he was known in Nepal by the title Nava Yuvaraj.

Nava Yuvaraj
Prince Hridayendra was born at 12:49 pm in the Narayanhity Royal Palace in Kathmandu to Paras Bir Bikram Shah Dev, Crown Prince of Nepal and Crown Princess Himani Rajya Lakshmi Devi Shah.

His grandfather Gyanendra Bir Bikram Shah Dev is the deposed king of Nepal and his grandmother is deposed queen Komal Rajya Lakshmi Devi Shah, a member of the Rana dynasty. Through his mother he is descended from the Indian princely family of Sikar, which belongs to the Shekhawat clan. Following Hindu custom he was officially named Hridayendra Bir Bikram Shah Dev in a ceremony at the Narayanhity Royal Palace eleven days after his birth.

In Hinduism there are a number of stages to groom a future king. Hridayendra received the traditional rice feeding ceremony (Annaprasan ceremony) at the Narayanhity Royal Palace six months after his birth. The ceremony was carried out in accordance with Vedic tradition. He was fed rice by his mother, and then by other members of the Royal Family, during the ceremony. He was offered a gold coin by Prime Minister Lokendra Bahadur Chand and other officials following another traditional feature of the ceremony . Later, Hridayendra made his first public appearance in a chariot procession and was taken to holy sites in old Kathmandu, where worship and rituals were conducted. The prime minister acted as his guardian during this stage of the ceremony, and carried the prince around the temples to symbolise the bond between the people and the monarchy.

Place in line of succession
Hridayendra was second in the line of succession to the Nepalese throne line of succession to the Nepali throne. In August 2006, before the monarchy was suspended, the Nepalese government adopted a bill to replace the Agnatic succession law with equal primogeniture. The House of Representatives subsequently approved the bill. Had the bill become law, Prince Hridayendra wouldn't have been relegated to third in the line of succession, his older sister Princess Purnika being elevated to second, because a clause of the law stipulated that living dynasts would not be deprived of their position or titles, the new provisions going into effect for those born subsequent to the change in succession order.

In February 2007, there was speculation in Nepal that Hridayendra's father and grandfather would make way for him to take the throne. In July 2007, the Nepalese Prime Minister Girija Prasad Koirala repeated calls for the King and Crown Prince to abdicate in favour of Hridayendra though this was rejected by the Maoists.

Abolition of monarchy
On 24 December 2007, it was announced that Nepal would abolish the monarchy in 2008 after the Constituent Assembly elections. On 28 May 2008, the monarchy was officially abolished, replaced by an interim secular federal republic.

Prior to the abolition of the monarchy, Hridayendra attended Rupy's International School in Kathmandu with his sisters deposed Princesses Purnika and Kritika. In July 2008, Hridayendra left Nepal with his mother and sisters to move to Singapore to join his father who had been making arrangements for the family to live in the country.

References

Nepalese princes
People from Kathmandu
2002 births
Living people
21st-century Nepalese nobility
Nepalese Hindus
Nepalese people of Indian descent